Sam van Rooy (born 27 May 1985 in Antwerp, Belgium) is a Belgian-Flemish politician for Vlaams Belang, author, blogger and former professional cyclist.

Biography  
Van Rooy was born in Antwerp in 1985. He is the son of Flemish writer Wim van Rooy. He graduated with a degree in engineering from the University of Antwerp and was also a professional cyclist from 2001 to 2006 and raced with the Flemish youth team.

In 2011 Van Rooy lived and worked in the Netherlands as a policy director for Geert Wilders and the Party for Freedom party, before Wilders dismissed him from the party over a controversial video Van Rooy had published online. In the video, Van Rooy followed several women wearing burqas around in a shopping centre, labelling them "scum". He responded that "What nonsense that you can't call people scum," "people who reject Western values in favor of a racist, fascist and inhumane system like Sharia are just scum, just like Nazis and other fascists." Van Rooy joined Vlaams Belang in 2012 and became a press spokesman for the party. In 2012 he participated in the international counter-jihad conference in Brussels, billed as the "International Conference for Free Speech & Human Rights". In 2019, he was elected as a councilor in Antwerp and succeeded Filip Dewinter as the Vlaams Belang group leader in the Antwerp city council. The same year he was also elected to the Flemish Parliament. He is also a publicist and writer on the Flemish blog  site Doorbraak.

Works  
2010 - Islam. Critical essays on a political religion (ASP Editions, together with Wim van Rooy)
2012 - Europe staggers. The kidnapping of Europe by the EU (Van Halewyck, together with Wim van Rooy and Remi Hauman)
2016 - Why do they hate us anyway? (The Blue Tiger, together with Frits Bosch, Paul Cliteur and Wim van Rooy, among others)
2018 - So for freedom against Islamization (Breakthrough)

References 

1985 births
Living people
Counter-jihad activists
Members of the Flemish Parliament
Flemish politicians
Vlaams Belang politicians
21st-century Belgian politicians
Belgian writers
Belgian bloggers
Belgian cyclists
University of Antwerp alumni